This is a list of awards and nominations for Ruby Lin, whose acting career in film, television, producing and music career.

Film and television awards

Television

Film

Music awards

Fashion Awards 
2001 Watsons Beauty Awards : Most Beautiful Female actress
2005 List of top 10 Most Popular Commercial Models in China
2006 QQ Annual Entertainment Star award : Most Stylish Actress
2006 MTV Style Gala : Most Stylish Actress of the Year
2007 China Fashion Awards : Outstanding Contribution to Charity Prize
2007 Cosmo Beauty Awards : Best Makeup Artist
2010 Fashion Weekly Awards : Most Charming Actress of the Year 
2011 LUX Fashion Power Awards : Most favorite Stylish Actress

Other Awards
2001 Malaysia Heavenly Kings & Queens : Top 10 Artist (4th place)
2003 CCTV 1 & CCTV 8 : Top 10 Artists of the Year
2006 Tom Hero Award : Top 4 Actress of the Year
2007 BQ Big Name Annual Award : Most Popular Actress
2009 China Charity Star Award : Children's Most Favorite Star
2009 China Forbes Magazine Award : Charity Star of the Year
2009 China International Commercial and Art Awards : Most Powerful Spoke-person Star 
2010 Seoul International Tourism Awards : Contribution Foreign Artist 
2016 Women's Media Award : Influential Woman of the Year

References 

Lists of awards received by actor
Lists of awards received by Mandopop artist
Awards